Millway railway station was a short lived railway station built by the London, Midland and Scottish Railway to serve ROF Radway Green in Cheshire.

ROF Radway Green was opened in 1940 and was initially served by the nearby Radway Green & Barthomley railway station but a new station, consisting of an island platform, was constructed a few hundred yards east of Radway Green station to serve the factory directly.  The station opened in 1942 and was initially as Mill Lane, in 1944 it was renamed Millway, a name it retained until closure in 1959.

At its peak, in 1944, the station was served by 11 passenger trains a day bringing workers from, and returning them to various parts of Stoke-on-Trent and Macclesfield.

References
Notes

Sources

Disused railway stations in Cheshire
Railway stations in Great Britain closed in 1959
Railway stations in Great Britain opened in 1942
Former London, Midland and Scottish Railway stations
1942 establishments in England